Hamdi Akın İpek is the Chairman of Koza İpek Holding, a Turkish conglomerate that spans different industries and sectors in Turkey and internationally.

In May, he was arrested in Britain in relation to a Turkish request based on his role in 2016 Turkish coup d'état attempt to extradite him and was released with travel restrictions. He is due to face an extradition hearing in September, according to the British interior ministry. The Turkish government attempts to have him and extradited to face trial were blocked by the UK courts in April.

Education
In 1986, İpek received a MA degree from Harlaxton College, UK (British Campus of the University of Evansville, Indiana, USA) and a bachelor's degree in Business Administration from Hacettepe University, Ankara, in 1990.

Experience
Akın İpek is the Chairman of Koza İpek Holding, a Turkish conglomerate that spans different industries and sectors in Turkey and internationally. The group includes interests in the mining, media and print, aviation, agriculture, health and insurance sectors. Ipek sits on the board of all 22 companies in the Koza group, three of which are publicly traded.

Akın İpek began his career as a Marketing Manager in 1992 at Koza İpek Basın ve Basım San Tic. A.Ş., a printing business, where he has been president of the Board of Management since 2004.

He served as president of the Board of Directors of Koza Anadolu Metal Madencilik İşletmeleri A.Ş. and as chairman of Koza Altın İşletmeleri A.Ş. and İpek Doğal Enerji Kaynaklari Araştırma Ve Üretim A.Ş., three publicly traded companies on the Istanbul stock exchange with diverse interests in print, mining and energy.

Other notable positions held by Mr Ipek were the presidency of the board of ATP Inşaat Ve Tic A.S., a construction and commerce company; Koza Ipek Sigorta Aracılık Hizmetleri A.Ş., an insurance brokerage firm; and the chairmanship of ATP Havacılık Ticaret A.Ş., an aviation commerce company.

Akın İpek was chairman at Koza İpek Gazetecilik ve Yayıncılık A.Ş., the company that runs the Bugün and Millet newspapers and Bugün TV and Kanaltürk TV stations in Turkey.

Akin Ipek is also a director of the English company Koza Limited, a subsidiary of Koza Altin Isletmeleri A.S., which has mining interests in Scotland, Northern Ireland and the Republic of Ireland.

Charity

Akın İpek is a founder of the Koza İpek Educational, Health Services and Charity Foundation which helped to establish “İpek University”, the first university in Turkey dedicated to the arts and social sciences.

References

External links 
 Personal Website

Year of birth missing (living people)
Living people
Turkish businesspeople
Fugitives wanted on terrorism charges
Gülen movement